Saint-Méard-de-Drône (literally Saint-Méard of Drône; Limousin: Sent Meard de Drona) is a commune in the Dordogne department in Nouvelle-Aquitaine in southwestern France.

Population

See also
Communes of the Dordogne department

References

External links

 Official website 

Communes of Dordogne